A chatelaine is a decorative belt hook or clasp worn at the waist with a series of chains suspended from it. Each chain is mounted with useful household appendages such as scissors, thimbles, watches, keys, vinaigrette, and household seals.

Etymology 
The name chatelaine derives from the French term  which meant the mistress of a chateau. She would have worn a belt for her keys, which the current meaning of chatelaine derives from.

History 
In the ancient world Samnite women wore chatelaine that were rectangular and had a central section consisting of mail. A number of metal spirals were present across the chain's spiral. Each one had a perforated disk of metal. This kind of clothing originated from the Picentes. Ancient Roman ladies wore chatelaines with ear scoops, nail cleaners, and tweezers. Women in Roman Britain wore 'chatelaine brooches' from which toilet sets were suspended.

The remnants of chatelaines and chatelaine bags have been found in the graves of women in the seventh and eighth century in the United Kingdom. Often found with the chatelaine artifacts would be wire rings, beads, buckles, knives and tools.

Chatelaine bags refer to bags suspended from a waistband by cord or chain, which were popular from the 1860s to the end of the 19th century.

Chatelaines were worn by many housekeepers in the 19th century and in the 16th century Dutch Republic, where they were typically used as watch chains for the most wealthy. Similar jewelry was also worn by Anglo-Saxon women, as seen from the burial record, but their function is uncertain.

Status among women
The chatelaine was also used as a woman's keychain in the 19th century to show the status of women in a wealthy household. The woman with the keys to all the many desks, chest of drawers, food hampers, pantries, storage containers, and many other locked cabinets was "the woman of the household". As such, she was the one who would direct the servants, housemaids, cooks and delivery servicemen and would open or lock the access to the valuables of the house, possessing total authority over who had access to what.

Frequently, this hostess was the senior woman of the house. When a woman married and moved into her father-in-law's house, her husband's mother would usually hold on to the keys. However, if the mother became a widow, the keys and their responsibilities and status were often passed to the oldest son's wife.

Younger women and daughters in the house often wanted the appearance of this responsibility, and would often wear decorative chatelaines with a variety of small objects in the place of keys, especially bright and glittering objects that could be used to start a conversation. In the case of the absence of a woman of the house, the controller of the keys was often a hired housekeeper.

References

External links 
 
 18th Century Chatelaines

Antiques
Fashion accessories
Types of jewellery